Euseius noumeae is a species of mite in the family Phytoseiidae.

References

noumeae
Articles created by Qbugbot
Animals described in 1979